Fernando de Souza Nascimento or simply Fernando Souza (born April 19, 1987 in Piabetá-RJ), is a Brazilian central defender. He currently plays for Fluminense.

Contract
1 November 2006 to 31 December 2009

External links
 sambafoot
 CBF
 zerozero.pt
 placar
 Conhecendo a prata-da-casa

1987 births
Living people
Brazilian footballers
Fluminense FC players
Association football defenders